In ice hockey, a two-way forward is a forward who handles the defensive aspects of the game as well as the offensive aspects. Typically, a player's frame is not an issue in whether he can be a two-way forward. Perseverance is key to being a two-way forward, as it is an attribute that gives rise to battling in the corners or preventing odd man rushes by the opposing team. A two-way forward can contribute for the team both offensively and defensively, scoring important game-winning goals or making big plays from which his team receives a significant advantage over the opponent team. As such, good two-way forwards are often capable playmakers.

Two-way forwards that do not have top offensive numbers are sometimes left in the shadows of high-scoring forwards and so are rarely named to all-star games or all-star teams, but commentators often reiterate their importance to a team. The National Hockey League (NHL) presents its best two-way forward with the Frank J. Selke Trophy, awarded to the forward "who demonstrates the most skill in the defensive component of the game."

Active winners and nominees of the Selke Trophy

Jordan Staal, Currently Carolina Hurricanes, formerly Pittsburgh Penguins. Nominated in 2010;
Jonathan Toews, Chicago Blackhawks, Nominated in 2011 and 2014. Won in 2013;
Patrice Bergeron, Boston Bruins, Won in 2012, 2014, 2015, 2017 and 2022, Nominated every year from 2012 to 2022;
Anže Kopitar, Los Angeles Kings, Nominated in 2014 and 2015 won in 2016 and 2018.
Ryan O'Reilly, St. Louis Blues, Won in 2019.
Sean Couturier, Philadelphia Flyers, Won in 2020.
Aleksander Barkov, Florida Panthers, Nominated in 2022, Won in 2021.
Mark Stone, Vegas Golden Knights, Nominated in 2019 and 2021.
Elias Lindholm, Calgary Flames, Nominated in 2022

See also
Two-way player
200-foot game

References

Ice hockey terminology
Ice hockey strategy